The 1987 WAFU Club Championship was the ninth football club tournament season that took place for the runners-up of each West African country's domestic league, the West African Club Championship. It was won again by Africa Sports after defeating Asante Kotoko from Ghana 6-5 in penalty shootouts as both clubs had two goals each in its two matches.  A total of 45 goals were scored, a second consecutive one. Originally a 24 match season, as Sport Bissau e Benfica withdrew, Africa Sports automatically qualify in the quarterfinals.  Imraguens de Nouadhibou started from the semis and lost to Africa Sports there in two matches.

Not a single club from the Gambia and Niger participated.

Preliminary round

|}

Quarterfinals

|}

Semifinals

|}

Finals
The matches took place on September 27 and October 11

|}

Winners

See also
1987 African Cup of Champions Clubs
1987 CAF Cup Winners' Cup

References

External links
Full results of the 1987 WAFU Club Championship at RSSSF

West African Club Championship
1987 in African football